Dößel is a former municipality in the Saalekreis district, Saxony-Anhalt, Germany. On 1 July 2008, it was absorbed by the town Wettin. In January 2011 it became part of the town Wettin-Löbejün.

References

Former municipalities in Saxony-Anhalt
Wettin-Löbejün